This is a list of rural localities in the Rostov Oblast. Rostov Oblast is a federal subject of Russia (an oblast), located in the Southern Federal District. Its administrative center is the city of Rostov-on-Don, which also became the administrative center of the Southern Federal District in 2002.

Aksaysky District 
Rural localities in Aksaysky District:

 Starocherkasskaya

Azovsky District 
Rural localities in Azovsky District:

 Kuleshovka
 Samarskoye

Bagayevsky District 
Rural localities in Bagayevsky District:

 Arpachin
 Bagayevskaya

Bogucharsky District 
Rural localities in Bogucharsky District:

 Abrosimovo

Bokovsky District 
Rural localities in Bokovsky District:

 Bokovskaya
 Grachyov

Chertkovsky District 
Rural localities in Chertkovsky District:

 Chertkovo

Dubovsky District 
Rural localities in Dubovsky District:

 Dubovskoye

Kagalnitsky District 
Rural localities in Kagalnitsky District:

 Kagalnitskaya

Kamensky District 
Rural localities in Kamensky District:

 Abramovka

Kasharsky District 
Rural localities in Kasharsky District:

 Kashary

Kuybyshevsky District 
Rural localities in Kuybyshevsky District:

 Kuybyshevo

Martynovsky District 
Rural localities in Martynovsky District:

 Abrikosovy
 Bolshaya Martynovka

Matveyevo-Kurgansky District 
Rural localities in Matveyevo-Kurgansky District:

 Matveyev Kurgan

Milyutinsky District 
Rural localities in Milyutinsky District:

 Milyutinskaya

Myasnikovsky District 
Rural localities in Myasnikovsky District:

 Bolshiye Saly
 Chaltyr
 Hapry

Neklinovsky District 
Rural localities in Neklinovsky District:

 Golovinka
 Pokrovskoye

Oblivsky District 
Rural localities in Oblivsky District:

 Oblivskaya

Orlovsky District 
Rural localities in Orlovsky District:

 Orlovsky

Peschanokopsky District 
Rural localities in Peschanokopsky District:

 Peschanokopskoye

Remontnensky District 
Rural localities in Remontnensky District:

 Remontnoye

Rodionovo-Nesvetaysky District 
Rural localities in Rodionovo-Nesvetaysky District:

 Persianovka
 Rodionovo-Nesvetayskaya

Salsky District 
Rural localities in Salsky District:

 25 let Voenkonezavoda
 Gigant

Semikarakorsky District 
Rural localities in Semikarakorsky District:

 Susat

Sholokhovsky District 
Rural localities in Sholokhovsky District:

 Vyoshenskaya

Sovetsky District 
Rural localities in Sovetsky District:

 Sovetskaya

Tarasovsky District 
Rural localities in Tarasovsky District:

 Tarasovsky

Tatsinsky District 
Rural localities in Tatsinsky District:

 Tatsinskaya
 Uglegorsky

Tselinsky District 
Rural localities in Tselinsky District:

 Tselina

Verkhnedonskoy District 
Rural localities in Verkhnedonskoy District:

 Kazanskaya

Vesyolovsky District 
Rural localities in Vesyolovsky District:

 Vesyoly

Volgodonskoy District 
Rural localities in Volgodonskoy District:

 Romanovskaya

Yegorlyksky District 
Rural localities in Yegorlyksky District:

 Gaidamachka
 Yegorlykskaya

Zavetinsky District 
Rural localities in Zavetinsky District:

 Zavetnoye

Zernogradsky District 
Rural localities in Zernogradsky District:

 1st Rossoshinskiy
 2nd Rossoshinskiy

Zimovnikovsky District 
Rural localities in Zimovnikovsky District:

 Zimovniki

See also
 
 Lists of rural localities in Russia

References

Rostov Oblast